Oddvar Rønnestad (4 November 1935 – 21 March 2014) was a Norwegian alpine skier. He participated at the 1960 Winter Olympics in Squaw Valley, where he competed in downhill, slalom and giant slalom. He became Norwegian champion in downhill in 1962.

References

1935 births
2014 deaths
People from Kongsberg
Norwegian male alpine skiers
Olympic alpine skiers of Norway
Alpine skiers at the 1960 Winter Olympics
Sportspeople from Viken (county)